The Oklahoma Municipal League (OML) is an association of the incorporated cities and towns of Oklahoma, organized for mutual assistance and improvement.

OML's functions include: 
Working during legislative sessions to explain the municipal viewpoint, support bills useful to cities and towns, and oppose legislation detrimental to municipal government operations. 
Meeting with federal and state agency personnel to ensure that their policies and programs are compatible with and meet the needs of city and town officials. 
Bringing to public attention the issues confronting city and town officials and their impact on Oklahomans who live in municipalities. 
Appearing in appellate court, with the OML Board of Directors's approval, on cases that can have a statewide effect on municipal government.

External links
Oklahoma Municipal League

Organizations based in Oklahoma
Municipal League